Bethel is a small village located within the town of Hopkinton in the U.S. state of Rhode Island near the Connecticut state border.

Overview
Bethel is not commonly known among residents, as it is located within the CDP of Ashaway. Residents of Bethel identify themselves as residents of Ashaway and use the zip code for Ashaway. Bethel is located in northern Ashaway, north of where Rhode Island Route 216 intersects with Rhode Island Route 3.

References

Villages in Washington County, Rhode Island
Villages in Rhode Island